Elvira Farreras i Valentí (Barcelona, 1913 – Barcelona, 27 March 2005) was a Spanish writer of Catalan descent. She wrote poetry and essays, and was considered one of the best chroniclers of the Barcelona neighborhood of "El Putxet". In 1998, she received the Medal of Honor of Barcelona.

References

1913 births
2005 deaths
People from Barcelona
Women writers from Catalonia
Catalan-language poets
Spanish women essayists
Spanish essayists
Spanish women poets
20th-century Spanish poets
20th-century Spanish women writers
20th-century essayists